Champlain is a provincial electoral riding in the Mauricie region of Quebec, Canada, which elects members to the National Assembly of Quebec. It notably includes the eastern portions of the city of Trois-Rivières as well as Saint-Tite, Saint-Maurice and Sainte-Thècle. Its boundaries have remained the same since the 1973 election. However, the boundaries changed for the 2018 election as it gained Hérouxville, Lac-aux-Sables, Notre-Dame-de-Montauban, Saint-Adelphe, Sainte-Thècle, Saint-Séverin and Saint-Tite from Laviolette.

It is named after the founder of Quebec City in 1608, Samuel de Champlain.

It was created for the 1867 election, and an electoral district of that name existed even earlier: see Champlain (Lower Canada) and Champlain (Province of Canada electoral district).

In the April 14, 2003 election there was a tie between PQ candidate Noëlla Champagne and Liberal candidate Pierre-A. Brouillette; although the initial tally was 11,867 to 11,859, a judicial recount produced a tally of 11,852 each. A new election was held on May 20 and was won by Champagne by a margin of 642 votes.

Members of the Legislative Assembly / National Assembly

Election results

* Result compared to Action démocratique

* Result compared to UFP

See also
Champlain, Quebec
History of Canada
History of Quebec
Mauricie
Politics of Canada
Politics of Quebec
Sainte-Anne-de-la-Pérade
Saint-Maurice—Champlain Federal Electoral District

References

External links
Information
 Elections Quebec

Election results
 Election results (National Assembly)
 Election results (QuébecPolitique)

Maps
 2011 map (PDF)
 2001 map (Flash)
2001–2011 changes (Flash)
1992–2001 changes (Flash)
 Electoral map of Mauricie region
 Quebec electoral map, 2011

Politics of Trois-Rivières
Quebec provincial electoral districts